UTM may refer to:

Computing
 Unified threat management, an approach to network security
 Universal Turing machine, a theoretical computer
 Urchin Tracking Module, a Web analytics package that served as the base for Google Analytics
 Usability testing method, in interaction design
 UTM parameters, used in Urchin tracker and other analytics
 Unbounded transactional memory, transactional memory without bounds on transaction size or time
 Universeller Transaktionsmonitor, transaction system for Fujitsu-Siemens BS2000/OSD mainframe

Universities
 Technical University of Moldova
 Universiti Teknologi Malaysia, also known as University of Technology, Malaysia
 University of Technology, Mauritius
 University of Tennessee at Martin
 University of Toronto Mississauga
 University of Toulouse II – Le Mirail, France
 Universidad Tecnológica de la Mixteca, the Spanish name of Mexican public university Technological University of the Mixteca
 Technical University of Manabi, higher technical level university located in the city of Portoviejo, province of Manabí, Ecuador.

Other
 Ultrasonic thickness measurement, using ultrasound waves to determine thickness of metals
 Undergraduate Texts in Mathematics, a series of books published by Springer-Verlag
 Universal testing machine, a machine used to test the tensile and compressive stresses in materials
 Universal Transverse Mercator coordinate system, a grid-based method of mapping locations on the surface of the Earth
 Unmanned aircraft system traffic management, a system for cooperative control of unmanned aerial vehicles
 Union des travailleurs de Mauritanie (Union of Mauritanian Workers), a national trade union center in Mauritania
 Uniunea Tineretului Muncitoresc (Union of Communist Youth), Romania's former communist youth party organisation